The Final Night is a 1996 comic book crossover storyline published by DC Comics that ran through a weekly self-titled limited series and a score of tie-in issues spanning most of DC's ongoing titles in the month of September 1996 (cover-dated November 1996). It featured the Justice League of America, several members of the Legion of Super-Heroes and more than two dozen allied heroes, villains and scientists of the DC Universe banding together in the face of global calamity when an extraterrestrial entity called the Sun-Eater envelopes and extinguishes the Sun, causing Earth to freeze and wither into ecological collapse. 

Unlike other crossover events published by DC, the conflict of The Final Night did not revolve around a conventional villain. It was primarily a story of survival that focused on the main characters performing disaster response, while attempting to prevent impending mass extinction of all life on Earth. At the end of each issue was an in-story website feature written by S.T.A.R. Labs, giving information updates and emergency support to residents of the DC Universe as the crisis progressed.

The storyline is notable in DC canon for the death and disputed redemption of Green Lantern Hal Jordan, whose character at the time had been transformed into the villainous Parallax. Jordan's character was later restored to life and to his role as Earth's Green Lantern in the 2004 miniseries Green Lantern: Rebirth.

Plot 
In a brief prologue originally published as a promotional preview to the miniseries, before traveling to Earth's solar system, the Sun-Eater consumes the sun neighboring Starfire's newly-settled planet, New Tamaran and eventually triggers a supernova, seemingly killing all of New Tamaran's inhabitants. 

An unspecified amount of time later, Dusk arrives on Earth to warn the population that a giant extraterrestrial being, known as the Sun-Eater, is heading our way. Dusk is a member of an unknown alien race and does not speak or understand a word of English, so Saturn Girl uses her telepathic powers to translate and teach her the language. Dusk has attempted to warn hundreds of worlds, prior to Earth, about the Sun-Eater. Each planet had tried, in its own way, to stop the Sun-Eater, but every attempt was as unsuccessful as the last one. This has convinced Dusk that the Sun-Eater is indestructible.

Despite her warnings, the Justice League still try to stop the Sun-Eater. For their first attempt, Mister Miracle tries using his boom tube to send it into another dimension. This proves unsuccessful, since they discover that the Sun-Eater is not entirely in our dimension. As a last resort, Superman and several other "heat-producing" heroes combine their energies to create a second sun and try to lure the Sun-Eater away from the Sun. The Sun-Eater quickly consumes that sun before moving on to the Sun.

As the Sun is extinguished, Earth falls into chaos and the planet starts to freeze. There are only five days to restore the Sun, after which Earth will become uninhabitable. Powerless to do anything to stop the freeze, the League tries to help control the chaos and to keep hope alive. Many people freeze to death. Wildcat is badly injured. Etrigan the Demon offers the entire world heat at the cost of their souls; the world rejects him, primarily because his plan was to shift Earth into Hell. Lex Luthor teams up with the League to try to reignite the Sun.

The events of this series cross over into other books as well. Superman encounters Ferro Lad, who would later make an abortive attempt to destroy the Sun-Eater. The Ray devotes his attentions to a small Mexican town. Tommy Monaghan (Hitman) holes up in his favorite bar, Noonan's.

Seeing Earth as just another failure (and after being attacked by an angry mob who had accused her of bringing the Sun-Eater to Earth in the first place), Dusk decides that it is time for her to move on. As she prepares for takeoff, she encounters a stranger, and is shocked that he understands her language. The stranger takes Dusk on a quick trip around the world and shows her the League's efforts to keep hope alive. Dusk doubts that there is any hope left for the world. Eventually, the stranger disappears and Dusk is left alone in an alleyway. She is found by a small group of people and, thinking they are going to attack her again, prepares to defend herself. To her surprise, the group offer to take her to a shelter where she will be safe. This act of kindness gives her hope for the planet.

Meanwhile, scientists have realized that the Sun is losing energy, but not mass, to the Sun-Eater. This will cause the Sun to go nova and the explosion will catapult the Sun-Eater into another solar system, where it will consume another sun. The assembled heroes construct a technological means of destroying the Sun-Eater. Lex Luthor angrily bows out of piloting the ship needed, revealing that he was in it simply to save his own skin, prompting Superman to volunteer in the hope that his powers will be restored by the solar surge as the Sun is restored. Ferro Lad steals the ship, only to be shunted back to Earth by Hal Jordan, the former Green Lantern then known as Parallax. Parallax sacrifices his life to absorb the Sun-Eater and reignite the Sun, simultaneously using his powers to safely restore it to its original form without causing any side-effects, such as the mass flooding that would have resulted if the Sun had been restored purely by Luthor's plan.

The League watches in astonishment and Dusk says she no longer believes that anything is impossible.

Key events and aftermath
 The Final Night culminates in the death of Hal Jordan and is the first in a series of storylines that eventually redeem him for his crimes committed as Parallax in Emerald Twilight and Zero Hour: Crisis in Time!. Hal Jordan returns in the 1999 crossover storyline Day of Judgment, in which his soul becomes a host for the Spectre-Force. He later returns to life and is reinstated as Earth's Green Lantern in 2004's Green Lantern: Rebirth miniseries. His death in defeating the Sun-Eater remains a key point in the character's history, as it has been referenced in numerous storylines since, including 2009's Blackest Night crossover storyline.
 Ferro Lad is re-introduced in post-Zero Hour continuity as Ferro. The young hero's death was a major event in the Legion of Super-Heroes' Silver Age adventures, but was no longer in continuity at this time. This new incarnation of the character later joins the faction of Legionnaires stranded in the present and eventually returns to the 30th Century with them.
 Starfire's recently settled home world of New Tamaran is destroyed, marking the second Tamaranean world to die. Though Starfire survives the cataclysm, casualties include her sister and former Teen Titans villain, Blackfire, who is presumed dead until 2005's Rann-Thanagar War. The death of her world and people prompts Starfire to return to Earth some time later, eventually rejoining the Titans.
 Superman remains powerless after the Sun is re-ignited. This plotline continues throughout the Superman comics as his body converts into a being of pure energy and he develops new, energy-based powers requiring a specialized containment suit to maintain control of them and stay alive, while also causing his skin to assume a blue pigment when his powers are fully active. Superman adapts the suit into a new blue-and-white costume, which he sports for a period of time before he eventually regains his original powers and defaults back to his traditional costume.
 In a later flashback to The Final Night occurring in the final page of Green Arrow (vol. 2) #137 (Oct. 1998), it is revealed that, prior to sacrificing his life, Hal Jordan had used his power as Parallax to resurrect his longtime friend Oliver Queen, the Green Arrow, who died in his own series in 1995. Queen made his official return to the DC Universe in Quiver storyline of Green Arrow (vol. 3) #1 in 2001.

Reading order
The Final Night was primarily self-contained to a weekly four-issue limited series, with a number of tie-in issues reflecting the impacts of the storyline across the DC Universe in different characters' ongoing series. A special eight-page black-and-white preview solicitation was released prior to the first issue starring Starfire, which introduced Dusk and detailed the Sun-Eater's destruction of New Tamaran prior to traveling to Earth's solar system. A special tie-in one-shot starring Hal Jordan, Parallax: Emerald Night #1, was released between The Final Night #3 and #4, which told the events leading to Jordan's appearance in The Final Night #4. Both the Parallax one-shot and the fully colored preview story were later reprinted in the Final Night collected edition, along with the central miniseries.

Week Zero
The Final Night Preview

Week One
The Final Night #1
The Power of Shazam! #20
Sovereign Seven #16
Superman (vol. 2) #117

Week Two
The Final Night #2
The Adventures of Superman #540
Batman #536
Green Arrow (vol. 2) #114
Supergirl (vol. 2) #3

Week Three
The Final Night #3
Action Comics #727
Aquaman (vol. 4) #26
Detective Comics #703
Superboy (vol. 3) #33

Week Four
Parallax: Emerald Night #1
The Flash (vol. 2) #119
Hitman #8
Legion of Super-Heroes (vol. 4) #86
Robin (vol. 4) #35
The Spectre (vol. 3) #47
Superman: The Man of Steel #62
Takion #6

Week Five
The Final Night #4
Green Lantern (vol. 3) #81

Green Lantern (vol. 3) #81, while not an official tie-in, featured the funeral of Hal Jordan and served as an epilogue to the story. It is not included in the first The Final Night collected edition, but 2021 edition includes this issue. 

The Supergirl tie-in issue continued into Supergirl #4, which took place prior to The Final Night'''s conclusion was published the following month and was not labeled as an official tie-in.

Awards
The story earned the most votes for the Comics Buyer's Guide Fan Awards'' for Favorite Comic-Book Story and Favorite Limited Series for 1997.

References

External links
Comics Buyer's Guide Fan Awards

Justice League storylines